Omar Al-Muziel (born 25 July 1992) is a Saudi Arabian professional footballer who currently plays for Al-Shoulla on loan from Damac.

Career
Al-Muziel started his career at Al-Mehmal in his hometown of Thadig. He joined Al-Shabab when he was 16 years old. He was promoted to the first during the 2014–15 season, however, he failed to make an appearance for Al-Shabab. On 8 February 2015, Al-Muziel joined Al-Orobah on a 5-month loan. He made 3 appearances for Al-Orobah in all competitions before returning to Al-Shabab at the end of the season. On 24 August 2015, Al-Muziel joined Al-Wehda on a season-long loan. On 5 August 2016, Al-Muziel was released from his contract by Al-Shabab.

On 9 August 2016, Al-Muziel joined Al-Ittihad on a three-year contract. In his first season at the club he made 23 appearances in all competitions and started in the Crown Prince Cup final against Al-Nassr which ended in a 1–0 win. On 12 May 2018, Al-Muziel started the King Cup final win against Al-Faisaly. On 23 January 2019, Al-Muziel joined Al-Fayha on loan until the end of the season. He scored his first goal for the club on 16 May 2019 in the 5–2 win against Al-Wehda.

Following the expiry of his contract with Al-Ittihad, Al-Muziel signed a three-year contract with Al-Fayha on 30 May 2019. On 28 January 2020, he was loaned out to fellow Pro League side Abha. 

On 6 October 2020, Al-Muziel joined Damac. On 9 September 2022, Al-Muziel joined Al-Shoulla on loan.

Career statistics

Club

Honours

Al-Ittihad
King Cup: 2018
Crown Prince Cup: 2016–17

References

External links 
 

Living people
1992 births
Saudi Arabian footballers
Association football fullbacks
People from Riyadh Province
Al-Mehmal Club players
Al-Shabab FC (Riyadh) players
Al-Orobah FC players
Al-Wehda Club (Mecca) players
Ittihad FC players
Al-Fayha FC players
Abha Club players
Damac FC players
Al-Shoulla FC players
Saudi Professional League players
Saudi First Division League players